Carlos Gómez Casillas (16 August 1952 – 16 December 2017) was a Mexican football defender who played for Mexico in the 1978 FIFA World Cup. He also played for Club León.

References

External links
FIFA profile

1952 births
2017 deaths
Mexican footballers
Mexico international footballers
Association football defenders
Liga MX players
Club León footballers
1978 FIFA World Cup players
CONCACAF Championship-winning players